Pazhassi Raja Archaeological Museum is a museum and art gallery in Kozhikode, Kerala, India. The museum has a rich collection of historical artifacts from 1000 BC to 200 AD.

History

The building that houses the museum was constructed in the year 1812 and was then known as East Hill Bungalow. The bungalow was converted to an archaeological museum in 1976. In the year 1980, the building was renamed as the Pazhassi Raja Archaeological Museum.

Collection

The museum has exhibits from the megalithic age and the Indus Valley civilization.  The exhibits include ancient pottery, toys,  stone and other metal sculptures. Coins, Models of temples, Burial urns and umbrella stones (tomb stones of rulers) are part of the museums's collection. The museum also has a collection of  war weapons used by British soldiers and the official caps of British and French soldiers.

The special  collections of the museum include the Panchaloha idols and stone statues described as ‘War heroes'.

Governance

The museum is managed by the Kerala State Archaeology Department.  The Kerala State government had spent Rs.76 lakh for the renovation of the building with further improvements planned.

See also
 Kozhikode

References

External links

Museums in Kerala
Archaeological museums in India
Tourist attractions in Kozhikode
1976 establishments in Kerala
Museums established in 1976
Buildings and structures in Kozhikode